M.B. Smiley High School was a public secondary school in Houston, Texas, United States. Smiley, which served grades 9 through 12, and was a part of the North Forest Independent School District.  M.B. Smiley was featured in the film Fighting the Odds: The Marilyn Gambrell Story, which aired on Lifetime. The campus is now used as the main campus for North Forest High School.

Marilyn Gambrell, a parole officer who became a teacher, started a program called "No More Victims", which was designed to prevent children of incarcerated individuals from going to prison.

The library, the Carole M. Anderson Library, was named after Carole Mae Anderson, a Smiley English teacher who donated books to the school's previous library facility.

History 
The original Smiley facility was built in 1953.

In July 1980, the school's main building was burned to the ground, due to arson.  A series of portable buildings was brought in, and the completed new building opened in 1984.  

In June 2001 Tropical Storm Allison damaged Forest Brook High School and NFISD officials temporarily closed the school. District officials wanted to put the children on the Smiley campus. NFISD residents protested the plan. Some argued that because Forest Brook and Smiley were rivals, putting the students on the same campus would lead to incidents. On July 19, 2001 district officials announced that they would move Forest Brook students to B. C. Elmore Middle School until Forest Brook was repaired.

During the 2001-2002 school year, Smiley had 1,631 students. It had a capacity of 3,125 students. This gave the school a 52% classroom usage rate.

On July 20, 2007, some teenagers vandalized Forest Brook High with a water hose. After the vandalism of Forest Brook High School, North Forest ISD decided to merge Forest Brook's population into Smiley until Forest Brook was repaired. Some parents and observers criticized the decision, fearing territorial rivalries would cause tension between Forest Brook and Smiley students. School officials states that the repair would take at least four months. Forest Brook re-opened in the spring.

In 2007 Johns Hopkins University referred to Smiley as a "dropout factory" where at least 40 percent of the entering freshman class did not make it to their senior year.

In March 2008 North Forest ISD announced that it would consolidate its two high schools. The new school, initially located in the Forest Brook building, was named North Forest High School. However after Hurricane Ike North Forest High moved to the Smiley location. North Forest High used the Smiley building until 2018, when the Houston Independent School District (which absorbed North Forest ISD) opened a new North Forest High across Mesa Drive and converted the former Smiley building into the Education Learning Center, a professional development facility.

References

External links

 M.B. Smiley High School (2005-2008)
 M.B. Smiley High School (2004)

Former high schools in Houston
Educational institutions disestablished in 2008
2008 disestablishments in Texas
North Forest Independent School District high schools
Public high schools in Houston